Ram Vilas Sharma (10 October 1912 – 30 May 2000) was a progressive literary critic, linguist, poet and thinker. He was born in Unchgaon Sani, Unnao District, Uttar Pradesh. In a career spanning nearly five decades, Sharma authored over 50 books. He was the recipient of many awards including the Sahitya Academy award, Bharat Bharati, Shalaka Samman, Vyas Samman, and the Shatabdi Samman just last week.

In 1939 he wrote a scholarly paper on Suryakant Tripathi 'Nirala', presented at a session of Hindi Sahitya Sammelan.

Early life
Sharma was born on 10 October 1912 at Unchagaon Sani of Unnao district, Uttar Pradesh. He received his early education in his native village and at Jhansi. He went to Lucknow and gained his Master of Arts and Doctor of Philosophy degrees in English Literature.

Career
He started his career as a lecturer at Lucknow University, and then moved to Balwant Rajput College, Agra, as head of the English department. He retired finally as Director of KM Hindi Institute, Agra. Basically a critic, he gave new dimension to biographical-historical criticism, and analysed linguistic and literary issues from a Marxist viewpoint.

Sharma died on 30 May 2000.

Works
His study of Nirala's Ram ki shakti puja, Tulsidas, Saroj-smriti and parimal is a model of creative criticism. He won the Sahitya Akademi Award in 1970 for his Nirala ki Sahitya Sadhana (in 3 parts). His massive work Bharat ke Pracheen bhasha parivar aur Hindi won him the first Vyas Samman (1991) instituted by the K. K. Birla Foundation. He was Socialist both in thought and deed.

Among the Hindi writers those who impressed him most, besides Nirala the poet, are Acharya Shukla the critic, Bhartendu the pioneer and Premchand the novelist. He took them up for detailed study and wrote authentic literary criticism on them, though from the progressive angle. He analysed their personality and brought out their contribution to Hindi literature. According to him Bhartendu Harishchandra, Premchand and Nirala are outstanding not only as litterateurs but also as men endowed with magnanimity of soul.

Assessment of Acharya Shukla
In his assessment of Acharya Shukla (Acharya Ramchandra Shukla aur Hindi Alochana) critic Sharma emphasises the fact that the writer opposed feudal and courtly literature as it did not give a true picture of the life of the common people and contemporary society.

List of works

 Bharatiya Sahitya ki Bhumika
 Nirala ki Sahitya Sadhana (3 volumes)
 Premchand aur unka yug
 Acharya Ramchandra Shukla aur Hindi alochna
 Bhartendu Harishchandra aur Hindi navjagaran ki samasyayen
 Bhartendu Yug aur Hindi bhasha ki vikas parampara
 Mahavir Prasad Dwivedi aur Hindi navjagaran
 Nai kavita aur astitvavad
 Bharat ki bhasha samasya
 Astha aur saundarya
 Bhasha aur samaj
 Parampara ka mulyankan
 Bharat mein angrazi raj aur marxvad (2 volumes)
 Marx aur pichde huye samaj
 Ghar ki baat
 Bharat ke Pracheen bhasha parivar aur Hindi (3 volumes)
 Dhool
 aitihasik bhashavigyan aur hindi
 Pragati aur Parampara

See also
 List of Indian writers

References

External links
R V Sharma at Kavita Kosh (Hindi)

Hindi-language poets
Indian male poets
Indian literary critics
Indian male essayists
Indian male journalists
20th-century Indian journalists
Indian Marxists
Indian Marxist writers
Indian Marxist poets
Hindi-language writers
Recipients of the Sahitya Akademi Award in Hindi
University of Lucknow alumni
Academic staff of the University of Lucknow
People from Unnao district
1912 births
2000 deaths
20th-century Indian poets
20th-century Indian essayists
Poets from Uttar Pradesh
Journalists from Uttar Pradesh